

Jürgen Wagner (9 September 1901 in Strasbourg – 27 June 1947 in Belgrade) was a Brigadeführer in the Waffen-SS during World War II, the commander of the SS Division Nederland and was awarded the Knight's Cross of the Iron Cross with Oak Leaves.

In April 1944 Wagner was promoted to SS-Brigadeführer und Generalmajor der Waffen-SS and given command of the 4th SS Polizei Division. In August 1944, Wagner was given command of a Kampfgruppe (battle group), against the Tartu Offensive of the Soviet 3rd Baltic Front.

After the war ended, Wagner was extradited to Yugoslavia in 1947. There, he was put on trial before the military tribunal of the 3rd Yugoslav Army from 29 May to 6 June 1947 in Zrenjanin. It is not precisely known for what he was indicted. However, his orders for the mass executions of civilians in 1941 and later on reportedly played a role in his conviction. Found guilty of the charges, he was sentenced to death by firing squad and executed on 27 June 1947.

Awards
 Iron Cross (1939) 2nd Class (16 May 1940) & 1st Class (1 July 1940)
 German Cross in Gold on 8 December 1942 as SS-Standartenführer in SS-Infanterie-Regiment "Germania"
 Knight's Cross of the Iron Cross with Oak Leaves
 Knight's Cross on 24 July 1943 as SS-Oberführer and commander of SS-Panzergrenadier-Regiment "Germania".
 680th Oak Leaves on 11 December 1944 as SS-Brigadeführer and Generalmajor of the Waffen-SS and commander of the 4. SS-Freiwilligen-Panzergrenadier-Brigade "Nederland"

See also
List of SS-Brigadeführer

References

Citations

Bibliography

 Böhme, Kurt W. (1964). Zur Geschichte der deutschen Kriegsgefangenen des Zweiten Weltkrieges. Die deutschen Kriegsgefangenen in Jugoslawien 1949-1953. Vol. I/2, Gieseking, Ernst und Werner, GmbH, Verlag. .
 
 
 
 

1901 births
1947 deaths
Military personnel from Strasbourg
German mass murderers
People from Alsace-Lorraine
SS-Brigadeführer
Recipients of the Knight's Cross of the Iron Cross with Oak Leaves
Recipients of the Gold German Cross
Nazis executed in Yugoslavia
People extradited from Germany
People extradited to Yugoslavia
Waffen-SS personnel
Executed German people
20th-century Freikorps personnel
Executed mass murderers